The epithet the Angel may refer to:
 Francita Alavez, Angel of Goliad.
 Maura Clarke, Angel of the Land.
 Clara Barton, Angel of the Battlefield.
 Donaldina Cameron (1869–1968), Angry Angel of Chinatown.
 Rose Livingston, Angel of Chinatown.
 Billie Holiday, Angel of Harlem

See also
 Angel of Death (disambiguation)
 Angel of Harlem

References

Lists of people by epithet